Mr. Baby (also known as A Week with Mr. Baby) is a French adult animated 4-minute television series, that lasted 48 episodes, created by Marc du Pontavice and Carol-Ann Willering, produced at Xilam, conducted by Hugo Gittard and broadcast from 3 May 2009 to 10 August 2010 on France 3 in the Toowam programming block, and France 4 on the show Ludo programming block. The show is animated by utilizing Toon Boom Animation. In the United Kingdom, the series originally aired on BBC One from 2009 to 2012, and later aired on MTV from 2012 to 2014. The series has yet to air on television in Canada and the United States.

Unlike most of Xilam's shows, Mr. Baby was their first attempt at an adult animated series, despite airing on children's programming blocks in France. While the humor is not "R-rated" in levels of South Park or Robot Chicken, its humor was more "PG-13" in levels of shows like Beavis and Butt-Head, Clone High, Mission Hill, Futurama, and Harvey Birdman, Attorney at Law.

The show is known for its art style reminiscent of UPA cartoons, as well as Cartoon Network's Samurai Jack.

Synopsis
The series focuses on the everyday life of Mr. Baby, who thinks and even talks like a grown-up, but also has an incredibly, severely sharp tongue. He also has an older brother, Rudy, a skater-like rebel, and an oldest sister, Claire, who is a teenager.

Translations
Originally from France on the publicly funded channel France 3, Monsieur Bébé was translated into English (as Mr. Baby).

Voice cast

French
Féodor Atkine - Monsieur Bébé
Patrick Mancini - Patrick
Marie-Laure Dougnac - Carole
Alice Amiel - Clarisse 
Donald Reignoux - Ludo

English

Sean Barratt - Mr. Baby
Daniel Flynn - Patrick
Emma Tate - Carole
Amber Beattie - Claire
Chris Nelson - Rudy

References

External links
 Production sheet
 Mr. Baby: Episode guide (Archived)

2009 French television series debuts
2010 French television series endings
2000s French animated television series
2010s French animated television series
2000s adult animated television series
2010s adult animated television series
French adult animated comedy television series
Xilam
Animated television series about dysfunctional families
France Télévisions television comedy